Ischyrus quadripunctatus, the four-spotted fungus beetle, is a species of pleasing fungus beetle in the family Erotylidae. It is found in the Caribbean Sea, Central America, North America, and South America.

Subspecies
These two subspecies belong to the species Ischyrus quadripunctatus:
 Ischyrus quadripunctatus chiasticus Boyle, 1954
 Ischyrus quadripunctatus quadripunctatus (Olivier, 1791)

References

Further reading

External links

 

Erotylidae
Articles created by Qbugbot
Beetles described in 1791